Polyamine-modulated factor 1 is a protein that in humans is encoded by the PMF1 gene.

Interactions 

Polyamine-modulated factor 1 has been shown to interact with MIS12.

References

Further reading